Jean Restout (15 November 1666, in Caen – 20 October 1702, in Rouen) was a French painter. He was part of the Restout dynasty of painters, studying under his father Marguerin Restout. He is also known as Jean I Restout or Jean Restout the elder to distinguish him from his son Jean II Restout (also an artist).

He married Magdeleine Jouvenet, sister of Jean Jouvenet, and his style resembles that of his brother-in-law so closely that many of Restout's paintings are misattributed to Jouvenet.

External links

References
 Édouard Frère, Manuel du bibliographe normand, Rouen, Le Brument, 1860
 Philippe de Chennevières, Recherches sur la vie et les ouvrages de quelques peintres provinciaux de l'ancienne France, Paris, Dumoulin, 1847–1862

1666 births
1702 deaths
Artists from Caen
17th-century French painters
French male painters